Konrad Elser is a German pianist, born in Schwäbisch Gmünd.

Elser won the 1985 Epinal Competition, and was awarded the 1982 Concours de Geneve's 3rd prize and the 1987 Concorso Busoni's 5th prize. He has performed internationally as a soloist and a chamber musician.

He is a professor at the Musikhochschule Lübeck, where he has taught since 1992.

References
Musikhochschule Lübeck

People from Schwäbisch Gmünd
German classical pianists
Male classical pianists
Living people
Year of birth missing (living people)
21st-century classical pianists
21st-century male musicians